The George Wyman House is a historic house in Winchester, Massachusetts.  The 2.5-story wood-frame house was built in the late 1820s, and is a rare local example of transitional Federal-Greek Revival styling.  Basically Federal in its form, with side gable roof and five bay front, its center entry with full-length sidelights is more Greek Revival in character.  The house was built by George Wyman near the site of one of the first houses to be built in what is now Winchester (c. 1660).

The house was listed on the National Register of Historic Places in 1989.

See also
National Register of Historic Places listings in Winchester, Massachusetts

References

Houses on the National Register of Historic Places in Winchester, Massachusetts
Houses in Winchester, Massachusetts